is an event hall located on the 7th floor of the Humax Pavilion Shinjuku complex, 1-20-1 Kabukicho, Tokyo, Japan. It mainly hosts mixed martial arts, boxing and professional wrestling events. Shinjuku Face has a capacity of approximately 600 people.

History
From 1994 to 2004, the place was used as a live venue known at the time as Liquid Room. In 2004, Liquid Room moved out of Humax Pavilion Shinjuku.

The hall was officially opened on July 29, 2005, with the first event being a women's martials arts competition called W-FACE.

References

 

Indoor arenas in Japan
Sports venues in Tokyo
Boxing venues in Japan
Sports venues completed in 2005
2005 establishments in Japan
Buildings and structures in Shinjuku